Pješčanica is a village in central Croatia, in the municipality of Gvozd, Sisak-Moslavina County. It is connected by the D6 highway.

History

Demographics
According to the 2011 census, the village of Pješčanica has 161 inhabitants. This represents 24.36% of its pre-war population according to the 1991 census.

Population by ethnicity

Notable natives and residents

References 

Populated places in Sisak-Moslavina County
Serb communities in Croatia